The Vickers Valparaiso was a British light bomber biplane of the 1920s. It was designed by Vickers as a development of its Vixen for export, being sold to Portugal and Chile.

Development and design

The Vickers Valparaiso was a derivative of the Vixen I for export purposes. It was renamed Valparaiso to distinguish it from the Vixen, which as it used classified government equipment, was unavailable for export. Two versions were available, one powered by the same Napier Lion as the Vixen, known as the Type 93 Valparaiso I, while the Type 92 Valparaiso II was powered by the Rolls-Royce Eagle engine  Other than their engines, the Valparaisos were very similar to the Vixen I, both being single-bay biplanes with wooden wings and steel tube fuselages. Both versions were purchased by Portugal, which ordered ten Valparaiso Is and four Valparaiso IIs, with the Lion-powered aircraft to serve as reconnaissance bombers and the lower powered Valparaiso IIs to serve as advanced trainers. In 1928, Portugal decided to license-produce a modified Valparaiso powered by a Gnome et Rhône Jupiter radial engine, and a single Valparaiso was modified by Vickers to use the Jupiter, followed by the production of 13 aircraft, designated Type 168 Valparaiso III by OGMA (Oficinas Gerais de Material Aeronáutico).

Operational history

The Portuguese aircraft proved to be successful in service, with two carrying out a long distance tour from Portugal to its African colonies of Angola and Mozambique and back in 1928, with the success of the aircraft resulting in the decision to license-produce the Valparaiso III. The radial-powered Valparaisos also proved successful in Portuguese service, remaining operational until 1943, finally being replaced by Westland Lysanders.

A single Valparaiso I (actually the prototype), was sold by Vickers to Chile in 1924. It was successful in Chilean service, resulting in an order for a further 18 modified aircraft, which reverted to the original name of Vixen, as the Vixen V.

Variants
Type 93 Valparaiso I
Napier Lion-powered export version of Vickers Vixen. 11 built.
Type 92 Valparaiso II
Rolls-Royce Eagle-powered version. Four built.
Type 168 Valparaiso III
Version powered by Jupiter radial for Portugal. 13 licensed-built by OGMA.

Operators

Chilean Air Force

Aeronáutica Militar (Portuguese Army Aviation)

Specifications (Valparaiso I)

See also

References

External links

 Vickers Valparaiso I e II (in Portuguese)

1920s British military reconnaissance aircraft
Chilean Navy
Valparaiso
Biplanes
Single-engined tractor aircraft
Aircraft first flown in 1923